The fourth-century Church Fathers Eusebius of Caesarea and Epiphanius of Salamis cite a tradition that before the destruction of Jerusalem in AD 70 the early Christians had been warned to flee to Pella in the region of the Decapolis across the Jordan River. The flight to Pella probably did not include the Ebionites.

The authenticity of this tradition has been a much debated question since 1951 when S. G. F. Brandon in his work The Fall of Jerusalem and the Christian Church argued that the Christians would have been allied to their compatriots, the Zealots; only after the destruction of the Jewish community would Christianity have emerged as a universalist religion. The Christian–Zealot alliance has hardly been taken seriously, but the historicity of the flight to Pella has been controversial ever since.

Ancient sources

References

Further reading
Brandon, Samuel G. F., The Fall of Jerusalem and the Christian Church, (London: SPCK, 1957), p. 167-184.
Bourgel, Jonathan, "The Jewish Christians’ Move from Jerusalem as a pragmatic choice", in: Dan JAFFÉ (ed), Studies in Rabbinic Judaism and Early Christianity, (Leyden: Brill, 2010), p. 107-138.
Pritz, Ray A., "On Brandon’s Rejection of the Pella Tradition", Immanuel 13 (1981), p. 39-43.
Gray, Barbara C., "The Movements of the Jerusalem Church during the First Jewish War", Journal of Ecclesiastical History 24 (1973), p. 1-7.
Gunther, John J., "The Fate of the Jerusalem Church. The Flight to Pella", Theologische Zeitschrift 29 (1973), p. 81-94.
Koester, Craig, "The Origin and Significance of the Flight to Pella Tradition", Catholic Biblical Quarterly 51 (1989), p. 90-106.
Sowers Sidney, "The Circumstances and Recollection of the Pella Flight", Theologische Zeitschrift 26 (1970), p. 305-320.

1st-century Christianity